Coleophora ningxiana is a moth of the family Coleophoridae which is endemic to China (Ningxia).

The larvae feed on wild and cultivated Lycium barbarum. They live on branches and leaves of their host plant.

Etymology
The specific name is derived from the type locality, Ningxia Hui Autonomous Region, where barbary wolfberry, Lycium barbarum, is an important plant in traditional Chinese medicine.

References

External links

ningxiana
Moths described in 2006
Endemic fauna of China
Moths of Asia